Yannick Plissonneau (born 28 March 1956 in Pornic, Loire-Atlantique) is a French former football player and manager.

As player, Plissonneau was a defender who played in Division 2 for Amicale de Lucé and US Orléans. With the latter club, he played in the 1980 Coupe de France Final against AS Monaco, and made the cross which led to Roger Marette's equalising goal, but Monaco won the match 3–1.

As manager, he led Luçon to the last 32 of the 2001–02 Coupe de France,
took charge of AS Angoulême-Charente briefly in 2003,
took over at Amicale de Lucé in 2004,
led them to promotion to the Division d'Honneur in 2008,
and left during the 2008–09 season.

Playing career
 1975-1979 : Amicale de Lucé
 1979-1980 : US Orléans

Honours
 1979–80 Coupe de France finalist (with US Orléans)

References

1956 births
Living people
French footballers
Association football defenders
US Orléans players
French football managers
Angoulême Charente FC managers
Footballers from Loire-Atlantique